Listeria aquatica is a Gram-positive, facultatively anaerobic, nonmotile, non-spore-forming rod-shaped species of bacteria.  It is not pathogenic. It was discovered from running water in Florida, and was first described in 2014. Its name comes from Latin, "found in water, aquatic".

Listeria aquatica is the only member of genus Listeria that can ferment maltose. It is also the only nonmotile Listeria that can ferment D-tagatose.

References

External links
Type strain of Listeria aquatica at BacDive -  the Bacterial Diversity Metadatabase

aquatica
Bacteria described in 2014